Rufina of Smyrna (3rd-century) was a Jewish rich woman in Smyrna.

A Smyrniot Greek inscription which is unusually described her:
 "The Jewess Rufina, ruler of the synagogue, built this tomb for her freedmen and her slaves. None other has the right to bury a body here. If, however, any one shall have the hardihood to do so, he must pay 1,500 denarii into the holy treasury and 1,000 denarii to the Jewish people. A copy of this inscription has been deposited in the archives."

The inscription is important for the knowledge of the Jewish culture of the period. She was the only example in which the office of ruler of the synagogue was held by a woman.

References

External links
 The JPS Guide to Jewish Women: 600 B.C.E.to 1900 C.E.
 RUFINA at The Jewish Encyclopedia

Year of birth unknown
Year of death unknown
Ancient Jews
3rd-century women
Ancient Jewish women
Ancient businesswomen
Smyrniote Jews